St. Xavier's High School & Junior College is one of the oldest English language schools in Mumbai. It is a Catholic English Medium High School for boys and girls, affiliated to the Board of Education, Government of Maharashtra.

The school was founded by Cyril Braganza in  1965. Braganza started Kindergarten, First grade, Second grade and Third grade in June 1956 with the advice of Valerian Cardina.

Peggy Soares was appointed as the first Head Mistress in June 1962.
The secondary school got registered and recognised by the Government authorities in 1962, and sent its first 10th grade batch for examinations also known as S.S.C in India, in the year 1964.

References

Minority schools
Catholic secondary schools in India
Christian schools in Maharashtra
Junior colleges in Maharashtra
High schools and secondary schools in Mumbai

St. Xavier's High School & Junior College is one of the oldest English language schools in Mumbai. It is a Minority Catholic English Medium High School for boys and girls, affiliated to the Board of Education, Government of Maharashtra.[1][2]